Matthew Reed, gridiron football player

Matthew Reed may also refer to:

Matt Reed (footballer), former goalkeeper in the English Football League
Matthew Reed (triathlete)
Matthew Reed (soccer) for Nashville Metros
Matthew Reed (sport shooter), see Shooting at the 2011 Island Games

See also
Matthew Reid (disambiguation)
Matthew Read (disambiguation)